The 1968 European Figure Skating Championships were held in Västerås, Sweden from January 23 to 27. Elite senior-level figure skaters from European ISU member nations competed for the title of European Champion in the disciplines of men's singles, ladies' singles, pair skating, and ice dancing.

Results

Men

Ladies

Pairs

Ice dancing

References

External links
 results

European Figure Skating Championships, 1968
European Figure Skating Championships, 1968
European Figure Skating Championships
International figure skating competitions hosted by Sweden
Sports competitions in Västerås
European Figure Skating Championships